The Beatz Awards, is a Nigerian awards music show first introduced on 13 November 2015, by Eliworld Int'l Limited, to recognize and celebrate outstanding achievements of the creative minds behind the music production, business, and distribution.

History
The event is composed of 31 categories and the 1st edition of The Beatz Awards was held on 17 December 2015, at Shell Hall, Muson Center, Onikan, Victoria Island, Lagos, with host Gordons, and Angel Ufuoma. Winners of the ceremony include Cobhams Asuquo, Masterkraft, Legendury Beatz, Don Jazzy, DJ Jimmy Jatt, Ubi Franklin, Clarence Peters, Kaffy, among other.

On 17 November 2019, The Beatz honoured Don Jazzy, with the Lifetime Achievement Award. During the ceremony, the New Discovery Producer category was renamed to Don Jazzy New Discovery Producer. On 8 December 2019, Don Jazzy promised 1 million naira prize to the winner of 6th edition of Don Jazzy New Discovery Producer. On 30 December 2020, The Beatz Awards held a pre-event of the 6th edition of the ceremony titled The Beatz Awards 20 for 20, to celebrate 20 biggest records of 2020.

Ceremonies

References 

Awards established in 2015
Nigerian music awards